The Four Brothers were a pop group from Zimbabwe. The members were not brothers. They played fast-paced guitar-based pop music with songs sung in the Shona language. Their lead guitar string-plucking sound is reminiscent of the sound of the African mbira instrument and is a style known as 'jit'.

History 
Founded in Zimbabwe (then Rhodesia) in 1977 by Marshall Munhumumwe and Never Mutare with Edward Matigasi and Aleck Chipaika, the band gained international recognition in the late 1980s with UK BBC Radio 1 DJ John Peel being their most well known advocate.

Marshall Munhumumwe was the maternal uncle of Zimbabwean star Thomas Mapfumo. Marshal Munhumumwe was the last born in the family of Thomas Mapfumo's mother.

At the time the Four Brothers formed, bands in Rhodesia were not allowed to play traditional African music. The Four Brothers therefore played rock and roll cover versions of well-known artists such as the Beatles. They took up a residency position at the Saratoga bar in Salisbury (now Harare).

After the Chimurenga war of independence in Zimbabwe, it became possible to again play traditional music. The band's format and instruments are influenced by western rock and roll but the sound is evidently originating from Africa. The lead guitar is played in such a way as to sound like mbira. Most of the early recordings were produced at Shed Studios, by Bothwell Nyamhondera, during sessions for Gramma Records.

Marshall Munhumumwe wrote most of the band's songs and music as well as unusually being both the lead singer and drummer. Their first big hit in Zimbabwe, 'Makorokoto', celebrated Zimbabwean independence. Makorokoto means 'Congratulations' in the Shona language.

International recognition 
After signing a deal with British record label, Cooking Vinyl, the band toured the UK and Canada. It is at this point that a rift appeared between Marshal Munhumumwe and Patrick Mukwamba as he claims he was cut out of the deal and left behind. This tour apparently brought the band a greater degree of musical freedom enabling them to buy new instruments and to record more.

BBC Radio 1 DJ John Peel championed The Four Brothers in the UK. They recorded  four radio sessions for his show between 1988 and 2000. The band played at Peel's surprise 50th birthday party at his home and he selected 'Pasi Pano Pane Zviedzo' as one of his favourite records of all time on the radio show Desert Island Discs in 1990. Peel is often quoted as describing the Four Brothers as "..the best live band in the world".

Death of main members 
In 1997 founder member Marshall Munhumumwe suffered a stroke, following a car crash. He was unable to continue to perform with the band and was replaced by Albert Ruwizhi. Munhumumwe died in 2001 at the age of 49 and the following year bass guitarist Never Mutare died. The last surviving member, Frank Sibanda died peacefully in December 2010.

Controversy and legacy 
In 2007, former band member James Nyamande who had been kicked out by Frank Sibanda after its demise in 2002, attempted to resuscitate the band but failed. By then he had formed his own band, the Makombe Brothers, although this group performed several Four Brothers songs. In 2012, Nyamande released an album under the Four Brothers name in an attempt to maintain the band's legacy, but was ordered by a civil court not to use the name, after objection from Marshall Munhumumwe's family.

In 2000 Marshal Munhumumwe bought a house next door to Patrick Mukwamba in Seke Township. He moved-in with his second wife Joanna, his oldest son Marshall Munhumumwe Jr. and Shingayi Munhumumwe, his second born son, both from his first marriage.

In 2016, Marshall Munhumumwe Jr., the son of the founder, joined the new Four Brothers/Makombe Brothers band as their administrator, to maintain his father's legacy.

Discography and band members

Mandega/Makorokoto
(7 inch single 1977) Zimbabwe Broadcasting Corporation (ZBC)

Mandega (Doing it alone) - Their 1st song. Makorokoto (Congratulations) - Their 1st hit.

Mandega
Makorokoto

Rugare
(US LP/Cassette 1986) WEA Records/Tusk Music Company SUH1048/ZSUH1048

Marshall Munhumunwe - lead vocals, drums, composer

Rugare
Pahukama
Uchandifunga
Wakasarudza Akanaka
Unondichemera Unondipei
Usagare Ne Chigumbu
Ndakatadzeiko
Swere Ngoma

Ndakatambura Newe
(LP 1987) Kumusha/Gramma Records KSALP119

Ndakatambura Newe
Nhaka Yemusiiranwa
Ane Mari Ndiye Mukuru
Chiiko Ichi?
Mashoko Ababa Namai
Zvaita Sei?
Vematongo Rooranai
Udza Vamwe Vako

Title
Patrick Mkwamba and The Four Brothers

Zvinonaka Zvinodhura
Dai Ndiri Shiri
..

Tonosangana Ikoko
Patrick Mkwamba and The Four Brothers

(LP 1984) Kumusha/Gramma Records KSALP104

Wapenga Nayo Bonus
Vakakunda Zviedzo
Kubhawa Handigare
Emeriya Usanyengedzwe
Mombe Youmai
Uri Tsotsi
Ndatendeuka
Mwana Wandaida Kuroora

Rudo Chete
(LP 1988) Kumusha/Gramma Records KSALP124

Rudo Chete
Ngatipindukewo
Vabereki
Wakazvarwa Sei
Kutambura Chete
Munondizvidza
Chenjerera Ngozi
Nhamo

Uchandifunga
(UK 12-inch single 1988)  (Recorded at Shed Studios, Harare, Zimbabwe) Cooking Vinyl FRY005T

Uchandifunga (Dance remix)
Makorokoto (lyrics wanted by public demand)
Guhwa Uri Mwana Waani

Vimbayi
(7 inch single 1988) Gramma Records

Vimbayi Part I
..

Makorokoto
(UK compilation CD/LP Gramma Records 1988 © Cooking Vinyl 1989) Cooking Vinyl COOKCD014/COOK014

Marshall Munhumumwe - drums and lead vocals
Never Mutare – bass and vocals
Aleck Chipaika – rhythm guitar and vocals
Edward Matiyasi – lead guitar and vocals

Makorokoto was released on the UK on the Cooking Vinyl record label and uses A Serengeti licensed product from Gramma Records, Zimbabwe. It was a  CD & LP release. The CD contains all 16 tracks while the LP version contains only 10 tracks. When the LP ‘Bros' was released the following year the tracks that did not appear on the Makorokoto LP were included as a free six track EP Gramma Records/Cooking Vinyl CHEF002X

Uchandifunga
Vimbayi (2)
Rumbidzai (6)
Makorokoto
Rudo Imoto (1)
Pasi Pano Pane Zviedzo (4)
Maishoko Ababa Namai (3)
Guhwa Uri Mwana Waani
Wapenga Nayo Bonus
Siya Zviriko (5)
Rugare
Ndakatadzeiko
Pamusoroi
Nhaka Yemusiiranwa
Sara Tasangana
Ndakatambura

Makorokoto
(UK 7 inch single) Earthworks DIG002

Makorokoto
Wasira Kupurezha

The Peel Seesions
(UK 12 inch red vinyl EP 1988) BBC Enterprises Ltd./Strange Fruit SFPS070

Never Mutare - bass and backing vocals
Frank Sibanda - guitar and backing vocals
Alick Chipaika - guitar and backing vocals
Marshall Ticharwa Munhumumwe - drums and lead vocals

Rugare
Uchandifunga
Vimbayi
Pahukama

Pasi Pano Pane Zviedzo
(7 inch single 1989)

Pasi Pano Pane Zviedzo
..

Bros
(UK CD/LP 1989) Cooking Vinyl COOKCD023/COOK023

Frank Sibanda replaced Edward Matiyasi – Lead guitar and vocals

Rudo Chete
Ngatipindukewo
Nhamo
Kutambura Chete
Zuro Chisara
Munondizvidza
Vabereki
Chenjerera Ngozi
Wakazvarwa

The Best Of The Four Brothers (Makorokoto)
(US compilation CD 1990) Atomic Theory ATD1106

Uchandifunga
Vimbayi
Rumbidzai
Makorokoto
Rudo Imoto
Pasi Pano Pane Zviedzo
Maishoko Ababa Namai
Guhwa Uri Mwana Waani
Wapenga Nayo Bonus
Siya Zviriko
Rugare
Ndakatadzeiko
Pamusoroi
Nhaka Yemusiiranwa
Sara Tasangana
Ndakatambura

Mukadzi Wepiri
(LP 1990) Kumusha/Gramma Records KSALP129

Mukadzi Wepiri
Chidhakwa
Mazita Nezviito
Zvakona
Chiroora
Tezvara
Musandodaro
Chandavengerwa

Wachiveiko?
Marshall Munhumumwe & The Four Brothers

(LP, Cassette 1993) Kumusha/Gramma Records KSALP147, L4KSALP147

Wachiveiko?
Ndiregerei
Karingazuva
Ndatove Muranda
Kana Wangoroora
Zvichakunetsa
Regai Nditaure

Mambakwedza
Marshall Munhumumwe and Four Brothers

(LP 1994) Gramma Records

Gona Ramachingura
Nditumbure
Muranda
Mwana Wezimbabwe
Buka Tiende
Mhuri Yandiremera
Pfumo Rangu
Musha Waparara

Kumawere
(LP 1994) Gramma Records

Kumawere
Maivepi Pandaikudai
Hapana Asina Muvengi
Matinetsa
Mativenga
Hama Dzatipfuvisa
Chero Uchindida

Mbereko Yakaramba
Marshall Munhumumwe and Four Brothers

(LP 1994)

Mbereko Yakaramba
Ndivumbamireiwo
Takabva Neko
Chawanzwa Usachipamhidzire
Chandagona Ndipembedzeiwo
Tichakunda Chete
Shungu Hadziuraye

Pfimbi Yemashoko
(LP) Gramma Records

..

Ndinvumbamireiwo
(7 inch single 1996) Zimbabwe Music Corporation (ZMC) FYF559

Ndinvumbamireiwo Part I
Ndinvumbamireiwo Part II

Greatest Hits 1994 To 1996
Marshall Munhumumwe and Four Brothers

(compilation CD 1996) Zimbabwe Music Corporation (ZMC) CDZIL308

Ndibvumbamireiwo
Matinetsa
Chero Uchindida
Vatendi
Tauraya Rudzi Rwedu
Rudo Rukave Ruvengo
Mbereko Yakaramba
Mativenga
Chawanzwa Usachipamhidzire
Kumawere

The Hits Of The Four Brothers Volume 2
(compilation CD 1996) Gramma Records ZCD121

Pfimbi Yemashoko
Wachiveiko
Rwendo Rusina Muperekedzi
Vimbayi
Ane Mari Ndiye Mukuru
Rudo Imoto
Rudo Chete
Mwambakwedza
Wadiwa Musamuzonde
Ndakatambura Newe
Rugare
Siya Zviriko
Guhwa Uri Mwana Waani

Manga Manga
(UK CD 1998) Positive Cultural Promotions (PCP) PCPCD02

Never Mutare – bass guitar and backing vocals
Frank Sibanda – lead and acoustic guitar and backing vocals
Albert Ruwizhi – drums and lead vocals
Robium Chauraya – rhythm guitar and backing vocals
(Aleck Chipaika played keyboards at around this time but does not appear on the CD)

Hapana Achanyara
Usagare Nechigumba
Mugomba
Vana Ve Mazuvaano
Ndinotenda
Hunhu Wemunhu
Chakaipa Chiri Nyore
Sarudzai Waenda
Vamwene Vanoshusha

Early Hits Of The Four Brothers
(compilation CD 2000) Gramma Records CDGRAMMA182

Uchandifunga
Vimbayi
Rumbidzai
Makorokoto
Rudo Imoto
Pasi Pano Pane Zviedzo
Maishoko Ababa Namai
Guhwa Uri Mwana Waani
Wapenga Nayo Bonus
Siya Zviriko
Rugare
Ndakatadzeiko
Pamusoroi
Nhaka Yemusiiranwa

Zvehama
(Cassette 2002) Zimbabwe Music Corporation (ZMC) ZC361

..

Ruvengo
(CD 2004) Gramma Records

Shungu Dzangu
Ruvengo
Rufu
Kunaka Kwechimwe
Mwari Baba
Molini
Hwenyakwese
Shinga Mwanangu
Shinga mwanangu

The recordings of The Four Brothers appear on many compilation albums. 'Pasi Pano Pane Zviedzo' appears on the 2006 compilation in tribute to John Peel 'Right Time, Wrong Speed'.

References

 Sleeve notes to ‘Manga Manga' by Brian Altchuler

External links
 Details of Peel Sessions for BBC
 Makorokoto - The Four Brothers Tribute Fanzine

Four Brothers